Nogometni klub Lučko is a Croatian football club based in the Novi Zagreb – zapad (New Zagreb-West) district in southwest Zagreb.

Founded in 1931 as SK Velebit, shortly after renamed into NK Velebit, it is one of the oldest clubs in its borough. Following a series of name changes, the club had been finally named NK Lučko, after the town name, in February 1962.

After achieving two promotions in three years, from the third division to the Croatian Second Football League in 2009 and two seasons later, in 2011, to the Prva HNL, Lučko currently plays in the Croatian Second Football League, the second highest division of Croatian professional football, after having been relegated at the end of the 2011–12 season, yet only because the league was to be reduced from 16 to 12 teams after that. They would have remained in the highest division otherwise, since they finished that season in a place that would have usually secured them another season in the top flight.

Players

Current squad

Recent seasons

External links
 

Association football clubs established in 1931
Football clubs in Croatia
Football clubs in Zagreb
1931 establishments in Croatia